MasterChef Canada was a Canadian competitive cooking reality show, part of the MasterChef franchise, open to amateur home cooks across Canada. It premiered on CTV on January 20, 2014, and has aired its seventh season. The show stars three judges: Claudio Aprile, Michael Bonacini and Alvin Leung. The show is produced by Endemol Shine International and Proper Television.

MasterChef Canada aired Tuesday nights on CTV and the Cooking Channel in the United States. It also aired also in Sweden, Italy and Spain. Seven seasons of the show were produced, with the first six produced under the executive production of Guy O'Sullivan. No announcements of future seasons have been made as of 2023.

Plot
On MasterChef Canada, amateur, non-professional homecooks are given the opportunity to compete in a series of challenges to win a trophy, a $100,000 CAD cash prize, and the title of MasterChef Canada. Each season generally begins with a larger group of finalists invited to compete in an initial challenge or series of challenges in order to win a white apron and a spot in the primary stages of the competition. Alvin Leung, Claudio Aprile and Michael Bonancini have served as the series' judges for the entire series.

In the first two seasons of MasterChef Canada, fifty contestants were given the opportunity to prepare and present their signature dish to judges, where a "yes" vote (concerning whether a contestant's dish is worthy of the judges' approval) from at least two of the three judges was required in order to win the coveted apron. Those who were successful were then presented with an additional challenge to determine which contestants deserved a spot in the Top 16; over a third of the apron-winners were eliminated at that stage. The third season featured a twist on the original auditioning format, in that three "yes" votes were required to win an apron, while three "no" votes eliminated a hopeful homecook, and a second chance battle between those with one or two "yes" votes was then held to determine the remaining competitors who would advance to a Top 14. Seasons four, five and six simplified the audition process by facing slightly smaller groups of contestants (eighteen to twenty-four finalists) with more specific, concentrated challenges with only twelve aprons up for grabs.

With exceptions to the rule, the primary phase of the competition on MasterChef Canada involved a two-episode cycle, in which two challenges were held in an episode; the former challenge would grant immunity and/or advantage(s) to one or more competitiors, and the latter challenge would result in at least one competitors being permanently eliminated from the competition. This cycle of challenges would be repeated until a small number of homecooks remain, usually three or four, in which each season holds a unique series of semifinalist challenges before a final two (or three) competitors are named. The main two-episode cycle's challenges generally consist of:

 Mystery Box Challenge: The competitors are all given a box with the exact same ingredients. The box usually conceals of specific ingredients (fruit, vegetables, seafood, meat, fish, etc.) or a required kitchen utensil underneath, and they contestants must utilize only those ingredients (sometimes with an additional pantry of staples) to create an elevated, MasterChef Canada-worthy dish within a set amount of time. Sometimes, a special guest may also appear to inspire the cooks and will serve as a guest judge for the challenge. At the end of the challenge, the judges take a quick look at all of the completed dishes and usually call forward the three most promising dishes up for tasting. A single winner from these three is usually named, and the competitor is then invited to join the judges in the pantry to hear about the advantage won - this typically includes a form of control over the upcoming elimination challenges, as well as occasionally immunity from the elimination challenge that night.
 Elimination Challenge: Competitors are tasked with completing a specific challenge directly inspired by the decision(s) of the winner of the mystery box challenge. At the end of the challenge each of the contestant's dishes are separately brought up for evaluation and critiquing by the judges. Usually the two or three best competitors in the elimination challenge are named opposing team captains in the upcoming team challenge. The judges then call forward a bottom two or three, from which at least one cook is eliminated permanently from the competition.
 Team Challenge: The competitors arrive at an off-site location (beach, carnival, airbase, wedding, school, etc.) and are split into two or three teams by either the judges or team captains (who themselves are either decided by the judges directly or the results of the previous elimination challenge). The teams are asked to serve a single-dish or mult-course meal for a set group of diners; the winning team is decided either by voting from the diners or by the call of the judges themselves. The winning team is exempt from the upcoming pressure test, while the losing team(s) are to individually cook for their lives. Typically when there are six competitors remaining, the team challenge is a Restaurant Takeover challenge, in which cooks take over a well-known restaurant (sometimes owned by one of the judges) for a set service.
 Pressure Test: Competitors who lost the previous team challenge are required to compete against one another back in the MasterChef Canada kitchen; occasionally, before the challenge begins competitors may be saved from partaking in the pressure test by either the judges, the winning team, the losing team's captain, or team consensus. Often requiring competitors to replicate a technically complicated dish predetermined by the judges, all of the dishes are evaluated and critiqued by the judges. Those who rise to the occasion and put out up-to-standard dishes are sent to safety on the balcony while the weakest cooks are faced with elimination; at least one cook is permanently eliminated from the competition.

This cycle is occasionally disrupted for special challenges following double eliminations, in which challenges such as a skills test or gauntlet can take place. Additionally, on several occasions there have been opportunities for selected competitors to win their way back into the competition through anywhere from one to three challenges.

After a final two (or three) competitors are determined through a unique-to-each-season semifinalist challenge sequence, the finalists are given their final challenge: they will compete head-to-head in a three-hour, three-course (appetizer, entrée, dessert) final challenge while friends, family and former competitors spectate and cheer them on. Each course is judged privately by the judges; in some seasons, the finalists are required to cook each course back-to-back without rest. After all of the courses have been sampled, and the judges have deliberated, a winner is eventually crowned - the winner receives a trophy, a $100,000 CAD cash prize, and the title of MasterChef Canada.

Judges and hosts

Claudio Aprile, chef and owner of Toronto restaurant Xango.
Michael Bonacini, chef and co-owner of the O&B family of Toronto restaurants Jump, Canoe, Luma and Bannock.
Alvin Leung, owner of Michelin-starred restaurants Bo Innovation in Hong Kong and Bo London in London, UK. Additionally, several guest judges have appeared throughout the series for specific challenges, such as Graham Elliot, Chris Hadfield and Tessa Virtue.

Seasons

 Specials

References

External links
 Producer website: Proper Television MasterChef Canada
 TV network website: CTV MasterChef Canada

 
2010s Canadian reality television series
2014 Canadian television series debuts
English-language television shows
CTV Television Network original programming
Television series by Proper Television
Television series by Bell Media
Television series by Banijay
MasterChef
Canadian television series based on British television series
2020s Canadian reality television series
2010s Canadian cooking television series
Cooking competitions in Canada